Christopher Misiano  is an American television director and producer.  He is best known for his work on ER, The West Wing, and Studio 60 on the Sunset Strip. In 2017, he sold his historic home in Los Feliz, Los Angeles, for US$4.3 million.

Filmography

Pan Am
Fringe
Grey's Anatomy
Eli Stone
Studio 60 on the Sunset Strip
ER
Revenge
The West Wing
Trinity
Nash Bridges
Law & Order
Mistresses
Third Watch
The Good Wife
Perception
Emergence
Stumptown
Council of Dads

External links

References

American television producers
American television directors
Living people
Primetime Emmy Award winners
Directors Guild of America Award winners
Year of birth missing (living people)
Place of birth missing (living people)
People from Los Feliz, Los Angeles